Vladimir Sukharev (July 10, 1924 – April 30, 1997) was a Soviet athlete, born in Georgievka, who competed mainly in the 100 metres. He trained at Dynamo in Moscow.

He competed for the USSR in the 1952 Summer Olympics held in Helsinki in the 4 x 100 metre relay where he won the silver medal with his team mates Boris Tokarev, Levan Kalyayev and Levan Sanadze.

Four years later at the 1956 Summer Olympics held in Melbourne he again teamed up with Boris Tokarev and new members Leonid Bartenev and Yuriy Konovalov in the 4 x 100 metre relay where the team won the silver medal.

Competition record

References

1924 births
1997 deaths
People from Jambyl Region
Kazakhstani male sprinters
Soviet male sprinters
Olympic silver medalists for the Soviet Union
Athletes (track and field) at the 1952 Summer Olympics
Athletes (track and field) at the 1956 Summer Olympics
Olympic athletes of the Soviet Union
Dynamo sports society athletes
European Athletics Championships medalists
Medalists at the 1956 Summer Olympics
Medalists at the 1952 Summer Olympics
Olympic silver medalists in athletics (track and field)
Burials in Troyekurovskoye Cemetery